"I'd Wait for Life" was the third single released from Take That's album Beautiful World.

Background
The song was written by Take That. Featuring Gary Barlow on lead vocals, the single was released internationally on 18 June 2007 as a download and CD single. Take That performed the song live on T4's Popworld for promotion on 5 May 2007. It was their first single to miss the top ten since 1992's "I Found Heaven", and ended the band's streak of 6 consecutive number ones.

Critical reception

The song generally received mixed reviews. Digital Spy praised Barlow's vocals and songwriting on the track, however, commented there wasn't enough to make the song stand out.

Chart performance
One week before the official release, the single charted at 109 on the UK Singles Chart, but jumped to number 17 after the single's official release. It slipped out of the Top 40 the second week.

Music video
The music video was directed by Sean de Sparengo and premièred on Channel 4 (UK) at 11:05 pm on Wednesday 16 May 2007. The video focuses on each member of the band sinking deep beneath water, symbolising the 10 years they each spent individually away from the media spotlight. There are clips of happy memories shown throughout the video such as parenthood and falling in love as well as unhappier times such as relationships falling apart and violence, which are used to represent the struggle they all faced after the band split. The video ends with Gary Barlow pulling Jason Orange out of the water whilst Howard Donald and Mark Owen make it to the surface and look around them reflectingly as they hang onto a raft.

Personnel
Gary Barlow – lead vocals
Howard Donald – backing vocals
Jason Orange – backing vocals
Mark Owen – backing vocals

Track listing
UK CD single (1736401)
 "I'd Wait for Life" (radio edit) – 4:11
 "We All Fall Down" – 3:47

Dutch CD single
 "I'd Wait for Life" (radio edit) – 4:11
 "We All Fall Down" – 3:47
 "Shine" (BBC Radio 2 'Live & Exclusive') – 3:36
 "Back for Good" (BBC Radio 2 'Live & Exclusive') – 4:11

Charts

References

2006 songs
2007 singles
Take That songs
Song recordings produced by John Shanks
Songs written by Gary Barlow
Songs written by Mark Owen
Songs written by Jason Orange
Songs written by Howard Donald
Polydor Records singles